Erbessa regis is a moth of the family Notodontidae first described by Hering in 1925. It is widely distributed across the upper Amazon basin, from Bolivia north to Ecuador.

References

Moths described in 1925
Notodontidae of South America